This is an incomplete list of philatelic periodicals:

English language
The American Philatelist (Altoona, PA: American Philatelic Association, 1887–1908; Bellefonte, PA: American Philatelic Society, 1908– ) 
Australian STAMPS Professional - 2007– . Australia, States & Territories; Oceania (esp. Papua); Commonwealth. ISSN 1834-6383
 Canadian Stamp News - worldwide topics with a focus on Canada 
Collectors Club Philatelist (New York, NY: Collectors Club of New York) ISSN 0010-0838
 Gibbons Stamp Monthly (London, Stanley Gibbons Magazines) 
 Linn's Stamp News (US) 
 Monthly Universal Post - Karachi, Pakistan
 The Philatelist (London, Robson Lowe etc.) 
Stamp Collecting, 1913–1984
 The Stamp Collector: Asia Pacific's regional magazine for stamp collectors (Milsons Point, N.S.W. : Brian Moore at Asia-Pacific Press, 1991–1995) 
 The Stamp Collector's Record, 1864 to 1876
 The Stamp-Collector's Review and Monthly Advertiser, 1862
 Austria The journal of the Austrian Philatelic Society - quarterly
 Stamp News Australasia www.stampnews.net.au incorporates The Australian Stamp Monthly, est. 1930. The only monthly magazine in the Southern Hemisphere, available in print or digital formats. Back issues can be read free online.
 Stamp Magazine UK

German language
 Das Archiv – Magazin für Kommunikationsgeschichte (Germany)
 Berner Briefmarken Zeitung (Switzerland)
 Die Briefmarke (Austria, journal of Verband Österreichischer Philatelistenvereine)
 Briefmarkenspiegel (Germany)
 Deutsche Briefmarken-Revue (Germany)
  (Germany)
 Faszination (Austria, journal of UN Post)
 Die Lupe (Switzerland, journal of Swiss Post)
 Michel-Rundschau (Germany)
 philatelie (Germany, journal of Bund Deutscher Philatelisten)
 postfrisch (Germany, journal of Deutsche Post AG)
 Schweizer Briefmarken Zeitung (Switzerland, journal of Verband Schweizerischer Philatelistenvereine)

French language
 L'Écho de la timbrologie (Yvert et Tellier, France)
 Timbres magazine (Paris: Timbropresse SA, L'Officiel de la philatélie) 
 Le Timbre-Poste, 1863 to 1900

Russian language 
 Filateliya (Moscow: Federal State Unitary Enterprise Publishing and Trading Centre “Marka”, 1966–present) .
 Kollektsioner (Moscow: Union of Philatelists of Russia, 1963–present) 
 Soviet Philatelist (Moscow: Organisation of the Commissioner for Philately and Scripophily, All-Russian Society of Philatelists, 1922–1932)

Other languages and countries

Brazil
 O Brazil Philatelico

El Salvador
 El Salvador Filatélico - El Faro (El Salvador, San Salvador, Official Journal of the El Salvador Philatelic Society - ACES 2004–)

Finland
 Abophil 
 Aihefilatelisti 
 Filatelisti 
 Keräilyuutiset 
 Suomen postimerkkilehti

India
 Stamps of India Collectors Companion (India, New Delhi)

Japan
 Yuraku, 1914 to 1922

Netherlands
  (Netherlands, Almere: Stichting Nederlandsch Maandblad voor Philatelie. 1922–)

Topical
 The BAPIP Bulletin (London: Holyland Philatelic Society, 1952–)
 The China Clipper (USA, Columbus OH: China Stamp Society, 1936–)
 Fakes Forgeries Experts (Kopenhagen, Denmark : Postiljonen)
 Monthly Air Mail (Liverpool, England : J.S. Davis, 1930–)
 Postal History News (Manly, N.S.W.: Ray Simpson, 1981–)
 World Cinderella News (Brisbane: T. Bolotnikoff, 1991– )
 The Middle East Philatelic Bulletin  (online,  2015–)

See also 
 List of philatelic libraries
 Philatelic literature

Philatelic magazines